Awjaz al-Masalik ila Muwatta Malik is an 18-volume arabic commentary on the Muwatta Imam Malik written by Zakariyya Kandhlawi. This work presents a comprehensive and detailed analysis of the Muwatta, including its various narrations, sources, and discussions on the legal rulings derived from the hadith, according to the four schools of thought. It covers not only the sources of the Maliki school but also evidence from the Hanafi school, making it one of the most important works of hadith commentary in the Hanafi school of Islamic jurisprudence. Its impact on Islamic scholarship has been profound.

Kandhlawi based his work on the commentary of Muhammad al-Zurqani. The first edition, published in India, consists of six volumes, while the second edition, printed in Cairo and Beirut, comprises fifteen volumes. The significance of this work lies not only in its academic rigor and scholarly insights but also in its accessibility to a wider audience, making it a popular reference for scholars and students of Islamic law alike.

Background 
Zakariyya Kandhlawi spent thirty years writing this work, with some intervals. The book starts with a detailed introduction where the author provides information on the science and organization of hadith, the history of hadith, Malik ibn Anas and his Muwatta, and the various commentaries and copies of the Muwatta. Kandhlawi also briefly mentions his own life, teachers, and chains of narration. He explains his method and sources for the commentary, as well as some of the terminology and principles of hadith used in hadith books.

Methodology 
Hadiths are categorized based on their quality, including shahih, hasan, and dha'if. However, hadith scholars and jurists have differing understandings of mursal, with some rejecting its existence. In this book, Zakariyya Kandhlawi provided a middle ground for mursal hadiths. He assesses whether a hadith is mursal by indicating its status and reason, and by citing corroborating hadiths from other books. If he cannot find a corroborating hadith, he explains the hadith's status from the perspectives of hadith and jurisprudence scholars.

Features 
Some features of Awjaz al-Masalik ila Muwatta Malik are:
The topics covered in this work are largely based on the teachings of previous scholars, and no new innovations have been introduced, as such innovations are often frowned upon in traditional fields of study. However, when there is no clear tradition on a particular topic, the author relies on extensive reading to clarify it, rather than solely relying on the teachings of scholars.
When conflicting traditions arise and there is no comparison presented by eminent scholars, the author may present his own comparison based on his research. Additionally, if the author understands a new comparison that has not been transmitted by scholars, he may present it.
The author generally attributes conversations to their original source, but in the case of Al-Zurqani and Badhl Al-Majhud Fi Hall Abi Dawud, their contributions are often not attributed as the author frequently quotes their sayings and has extensively used their teachings. In fact, the comment "Awjaz al-Masalik ila Muwatta Malik" can be seen as a summary of their teachings.
When discussing the men of Hadith transmission mentioned in the work, the author relies on Al-Dhahabi's authentication and criticism method for criticism or approval. Similarly, information on the men of transmission in Jami al-Usul is also transmitted. However, due to space constraints, attribution is often not made explicitly. If criticism or approval is taken from any other book, it is explicitly mentioned in the work.

Reception 
Abul Hasan Ali Hasani Nadwi relates that he once heard from Muhammad 'Alawi al-Maliki, a remarkably erudite and open-minded scholar of his time, that upon encountering the definition of Awjaz, he was taken aback by the depth of knowledge and precision exhibited by a legal expert of the Maliki school. He exclaimed, "Had Sheikh Zakariyya not identified himself as a Hanafi, I would have been incredulous of anyone who claimed that he was not a Maliki, given the abundant Maliki details contained in Awjaz al-Masalik that necessitate prolonged inquiry into our own texts." Abul Hasan Ali Hasani Nadwi further reports that even the Chief Justice of the United Arab Emirates, Ahmad Abdul Aziz bin Mubarak, a preeminent scholar of the Maliki school, has shown great interest in publishing and disseminating Awjaz al-Masalik ila Muwatta Malik. The fact that scholars from other schools of thought accord respect to and quote its statements and details without sectarian bias is a testament to the author's impartiality and represents a significant accomplishment for the popularity of Awjaz. Abd al-Fattah Abu Ghudda wrote a letter to Zakariyya Kandhlawi praising him for his commentary on the book of Muwatta Imam Malik, saying that it has opened people's hearts and minds and that he has worked hard to benefit those who use it. Abu Ghudda also stated that Zakariyya Kandhlawi's commentary is superior and more eloquent than all other commentaries on the same book.

Legacy 
The Hadis Research Institute (INHAD) organized a conference on Compilation & Writing Methodologies adopted by Hadith Scholars in November 2019, with a focus on the classical and contemporary perspective. The conference was held at the Selangor Islamic University (KUIS), Malaysia, and featured several speakers, including Syed Abdul Majid Ghouri. During the conference, Ghouri delivered a speech titled "The Approach of Sheikh Muhammad Zakariyya Kandhlawi in His Book Awjaz al-Masalik ila Muwatta Malik."

See also 
Deobandi hadith studies

References

External links 
  at Internet Archive

Deobandi hadith literature
Hadith commentaries
Islamic literature
Sunni literature
Hanafi literature
Arabic-language books
20th-century Indian books
Indian non-fiction books
Indian religious texts